Maria Krahn (1896–1977) was a German actress.

Selected filmography
 Wibbel the Tailor (1931)
 Pappi (1934)
 A Woman With Power of Attorney (1934)
 Hermine and the Seven Upright Men (1935)
 The Private Life of Louis XIV (1935)
 Pillars of Society (1935)
 The Valiant Navigator (1935)
 Don't Lose Heart, Suzanne! (1935)
 Susanne in the Bath (1936)
 Family Parade (1936)
 Augustus the Strong (1936)
 Stronger Than Regulations (1936)
 Another World (1937)
 Togger (1937)
 The Irresistible Man (1937)
 Woman's Love—Woman's Suffering (1937)
 Freight from Baltimore (1938)
 Between the Parents (1938)
 The Muzzle (1938)
 Napoleon Is to Blame for Everything (1938)
 Congo Express (1939)
 We Danced Around the World (1939)
 Wibbel the Tailor (1939)
 Mein Leben für Irland (1941)
  (1941)
 Much Ado About Nixi (1942)
 Der große König (1942)
 Gesprengte Gitter (1950)
 Two Times Lotte (1950)
 The Imaginary Invalid (1952)
 Elephant Fury (1953)
 Secretly Still and Quiet (1953)
 The Angel with the Flaming Sword (1954)
 Love's Carnival (1955)
 Roses in Autumn (1955)

External links

1896 births
1977 deaths
German film actresses
Actors from Cologne
20th-century German actresses